M. rosea may refer to:
 Marginella rosea, a species of sea snail
 Melibe rosea, the cowled nudibranch, a dendronotid nudibranch species only found in South Africa
 Mesua rosea, a flowering plant species found only in Malaysia
 "Microvirga rosea", a species of alphaproteobacterium
 Mycena rosea, the rosy bonnet, a mushroom species

Synonyms
 Miltonia rosea, a synonym for Miltonia moreliana
 Misumena rosea, a synonym for Misumenops asperatus

See also
 Rosea (disambiguation)